The Logie for Most Popular Sports Program was an award presented annually at the Australian TV Week Logie Awards. It recognises the popularity of an ongoing Australian sports program, where the general theme of the show is sport, with the emphasis on commentary and highlights.

The award was first presented at the 29th Annual TV Week Logie Awards, held in 1987 when it was originally called Most Popular Sports Coverage.  It was renamed as Most Popular Sports Program in 1993, then eliminated as a category in 1999 but reintroduced in 2000. For the 2016 and 2017 ceremonies, the award was renamed as Best Sports Program before being permanently eliminated in 2018.

The winner and nominees of Most Popular Sports Program were chosen by the public through an online voting survey on the TV Week website. The NRL Footy Show holds the record for the most wins, with eleven, followed by The AFL Footy Show with eight wins.

Winners and nominees

Multiple wins

References

External links

Awards established in 1987